Andrew Lam (born 1976) is an American retinal surgeon and author. He is currently an assistant professor of ophthalmology at Tufts University School of Medicine and the University of Massachusetts Medical School. Lam is the author of three books: Saving Sight, Two Sons of China, and Repentance.

Background 
Lam was born in Philadelphia, Pennsylvania and was raised in Springfield, Illinois. He graduated from Springfield High School in 1994. In 1998, he graduated summa cum laude in history from Yale University, where he studied military and Chinese history and was mentored by Professor Jonathan Spence.

Lam earned his medical degree from the University of Pennsylvania School of Medicine in 2002. He subsequently completed his ophthalmology residency and retina fellowship at the Wills Eye Hospital in Philadelphia. He has authored numerous scientific articles and book chapters on vitreoretinal diseases and has served as a co-investigator for several national clinical trials. He is a scientific reviewer for Retina: The Journal of Retinal and Vitreous Diseases. Lam currently practices with New England Retina Consultants, P.C., in Springfield, Massachusetts and at Baystate Medical Center, the western medical campus of Tufts University School of Medicine and a regional campus of the University of Massachusetts Medical School.

Books

Saving Sight 

Lam's first book, Saving Sight: An eye surgeon’s look at life behind the mask and the heroes who changed the way we see, was released by Irie Books in May 2013. The book provides a behind-the-scenes look at how eye surgeons perform cataract and LASIK surgery, treat macular degeneration, repair retinal detachments, approach eye trauma, and handle many other sight-threatening diseases. The author blends his experiences performing modern-day surgery with profiles of medical innovators whose inventions shaped the field of ophthalmology, including: Harold Ridley, Charles Kelman, Charles Schepens, Arnall Patz, and Judah Folkman. Louis Braille is also a subject of the book.
Saving Sight became an Amazon bestseller and won Honorable Mention awards at the 2013 New England  and London Book Festivals. It was also a Finalist in the 2014 Next Generation Indie Book Awards.

Two Sons of China 

Lam's first novel, Two Sons of China, was published by Bondfire Books in December 2013. The book is set in China during the Second World War and is based on the history of the Dixie Mission, in which a group of Americans were sent to Yenan in 1944 to evaluate Mao Zedong's Communist forces. American Foreign Service Officers John S. Service and John Paton Davies, as well as Colonel David D. Barrett, are historical characters in the book. Two Sons of China was a Gold Medal Winner in the 2015 Independent Publisher Book Awards and won Foreword Reviews' 2014 Book of the Year Award (military fiction). It also won the Chinese American Librarians Association's 2014 Best Book Award (fiction) and received Honorable Mention awards at the 2014 New England and London Book Festivals.

Repentance 

Lam's second novel, Repentance, was published by Tiny Fox Press in 2019. Repentance is a Japanese American, World War II family drama that is based on the history of the 442nd Infantry Regiment (United States), a group of Nisei soldiers that became the most decorated unit in U.S. military history. Repentance won the 2020 Independent Press Award for historical fiction, the 2020 Next Generation Indie Book Award (historical fiction), and was a "Must Read" Finalist for the 2020 Massachusetts Book Award.

In May 2014, Lam was named one of BusinessWest's 40 Under 40 (Massachusetts). His writing has appeared in The New York Times, The Washington Post, and The Dallas Morning News. He has been a featured commentator for PBS NewsHour and New England Public Radio.

Lam has served as a board member of the 80-20 Initiative, a national, non-partisan organization seeking to promote equal opportunity for Asian-Americans, and is a trustee of Bay Path University in Longmeadow, Massachusetts. In 2017, Dr. Lam received a NextGen Leadership Award from the Committee of 100.

References

External links 

Two Sons of China 

1976 births
Living people
American ophthalmologists
American surgeons
American war novelists
American medical writers
Yale College alumni
Perelman School of Medicine at the University of Pennsylvania alumni
American male novelists
21st-century American novelists
Writers from Philadelphia
Physicians from Pennsylvania
Writers from Springfield, Illinois
Physicians from Illinois
21st-century American male writers
Novelists from Pennsylvania
Novelists from Illinois
21st-century American non-fiction writers
American male non-fiction writers